"Hurricane" is the English-language Swedish hit debut single by the Swedish boy band duo Rebound! made up of Rabih Jaber and Eddie Razaz. The song was written by Svante Halldin, Jakob Hazell and Teddy Sky and was produced by Svante Halldin and Jakob Hazell.

The electro-pop song "Hurricane" was released on 12 April 2010 and reached the top of the Swedish Singles Chart on the chart dated 7 May 2010.

Charts

References

Number-one singles in Sweden
2010 debut singles
Songs written by Geraldo Sandell
2010 songs
Songs written by Svante Halldin
Song recordings produced by Jack & Coke
Songs written by Jakob Hazell